Ryan Burns (born 8 September 1992) is a Northern Irish football player who is currently playing for Dandenong Thunder.

Career

Early years
Burns started his career with Cliftonville where he was capped by Northern Ireland at Under-18 level. He made his first team debut for the club, aged 17 in the Setanta Cup against Sligo. He studied at Corpus Christi College, Belfast.

Oldham Athletic
After visiting Oldham Athletic on trial in April 2010, along with Carl Winchester he joined the club in May 2010 on a two-year scholarship.

He was named in matchday squads and was an unused substitute in matches against Accrington Stanley and Dagenham early in the 2010/11 season before making his senior debut for the club on 30 April 2011, starting the League One match against Swindon Town.

Burns was not offered a professional contract and so was informed he was being released by Oldham in April 2012 .

Career statistics
 correct as of 30 April 2011

References

External links

Oldham Athletic profile
Irish FA profile

Living people
1992 births
Association footballers from Belfast
English Football League players
Oldham Athletic A.F.C. players
Cliftonville F.C. players
Portadown F.C. players
Carrick Rangers F.C. players
Association football midfielders
Association footballers from Northern Ireland